John Klinger (born May 14, 1984) is a German professional wrestler better known by his ring name Bad Bones. Klinger has worked internationally across various independent promotions ranging from Europe, England, Japan, Israel and the United States.

Career

Total Nonstop Action Wrestling (2011, 2014, 2017)
Bad Bones first appeared in TNA during the September 29 TNA First Impact Tour where he defeated Karsten Kretschmer. He participated in and won the January 2011 edition of TNA Gut Check held in London, England.

Bad Bones returned to TNA in February 2014, during this time, Bad Bones worked in several matches for TNA. On February 1, Bones faced Christopher Daniels in a dark match, losing to Daniels. On that same night, during the regular broadcast of Impact Wrestling, he lost to Samoa Joe. The following night on February 2, at TNA One Night Only: Joker's Wild 2, Bones teamed with Samoa Joe, to defeat Christopher Daniels and Robbie E in a qualifying match for the Joker's Wild Gauntlet match. The $100,000 Joker's Wild Gauntlet was later won by Ethan Carter III. During the February 27 edition of Impact Wrestling, Bones was selected by Magnus to be the opponent of Magnus' rival Samoa Joe. He was defeated by Joe in the brief match that followed.

On the February 24, 2017 edition of Impact Wrestling, Bad Bones returned to TNA in a losing effort against the debuting Josh Barnett.

Championships and accomplishments
Art of Wrestling
AOW Championship (1 time, current)
Athletik Club Wrestling
ACW German Championship (1 time)
ACW World Wrestling Championship (2 times)
Catch Wrestling Norddeutschland
Deutsche Meisterschaft Championship (1 time)
Defiant Wrestling
Ringmaster Tournament (2018)
Deutsche Wrestling Allianz
DWA European Championship (1 time)
East Side Wrestling
ESW Europameisterschaft Championship (1 time)
European Wrestling Promotion
Spree Cup (2019)
Fighting Spirit Federation
FSF Tag Team Championship (1 time) – with Steve Douglas
Fiend Wrestling Germany
FWG Championship (1 time)
German Hurricane Wrestling
GHW Heavyweight Championship (1 time)
GHW Tag Team Championship (2 times) – with Carnage
GHW Heavyweight Championship Tournament (2009)
GHW Tag Team Championship Tournament (2013) - with Carnage
German Stampede Wrestling
GSW World Heavyweight Championship (1 time)
GSW Tag Team Championship (1 time) – with Steve Allison
German Wrestling Federation
GWF Middleweight Championship (1 time)
GWF World Championship (1 time)
GWF Tag Team Championship (1 time, current) - with Tarkan Aslan
German Wrestling Promotion
GWP World Championship (1 time)
WrestlingCorner.de Championship (1 time)
International Catch Wrestling Alliance
ICWA European Championship (1 time)
ICWA Tournament (2007)
International Pro Wrestling: United Kingdom
IPW:UK World Championship (2 times)
National Wrestling Alliance
NWA European Heavyweight Championship (1 time)
	Power Of Wrestling 
POW Intercontinental Championship (1 time)
 Pro Wrestling Illustrated
 Ranked No. 279 of the top 500 singles wrestlers in the PWI 500 in 2019
Swiss Wrestling Entertainment
SWE Championship (1 time)
SWE King of Switzerland Championship (1 time)
Union of European Wrestling Alliances
European Heavyweight Championship (1 time)
Unlimited Wrestling
Unlimited Championship (1 time, current)
Westside Xtreme Wrestling
wXw Unified World Wrestling Championship (3 times)
wXw World Tag Team Championship (2 times) – with Carnage (1) and Da Mack (1)
wXw Shotgun Championship (2 times)
Strong Style Tournament (2007)
wXw World Heavyweight Championship Tournament (2008)
wXw 16 Carat Gold Tournament (2008)
Shortcut to the Top Battle Royal (2013, 2017)
Catch Roulette Tournament (2014)
Mitteldeutschland Cup (2016)
WrestlingKULT
WrestlingKULT Championship (1 time)

References

External links

Cagematch Profile
Wrestlingdata Profile
TNA Gut Check Profile
Profile at Westside Xtreme Wrestling
Profile at German Wrestling Promotion
Profile at European Wrestling Association
Profile at Union of European Wrestling Alliances

1984 births
Living people
21st-century professional wrestlers
People from Bitburg
German male professional wrestlers
Expatriate professional wrestlers